Lament is the seventh studio album by British new wave band Ultravox, released on 6 April 1984 by Chrysalis Records. It was the last album featuring original drummer Warren Cann until the band's reunion album Brilliant in 2012. The album peaked at number eight on the UK Albums Chart and was certified gold by the British Phonographic Industry (BPI) on 8 June 1984 for shipments of 100,000 copies. It also reached number 25 in Germany and number 115 in the United States.

Background 
Ultravox were producing Lament themselves, a logical step considering the experience that they had gained working with two very different producers, Conny Plank and George Martin. Ure and Currie had at this time built their own home studios. Ures Musicfest Studio located in Chiswick and Curries Hot Food Studio in his basement in Notting Hill Gate.

The album's inner sleeve on LP releases features a photograph of Callanish Stones, a neolithic stone arrangement on Lewis in Scotland. On later releases of the album, this photograph appears on the front cover in place of the original tracklist, which is instead displayed on the formerly-blank back cover.

Ure tells Event magazine, "When Ultravox made Lament, we talked about having the entire sleeve black. My argument was, it's minimal advertising, and people would say, 'Wow, what's this?' Then Spinal Tap did Smell The Glove - none more black - and it was rubbish. A close escape."

Mae McKennas Gaelic vocals in "Man of Two Worlds" means: "Hand in Hand, taste the past, as I drink in this gift to me. Hand in Hand, taste the past, as I drink from it all".

Ure and Cross had travelled to Isle of Lewis to write lyrics for the album.

The tour was called "Set Movements Tour", including 5 nights at Hammersmith Odeon 6th to 10th of June 1984, and was supported by the band Messengers. The tour was sponsored by Levi's jeans. Ure and Cross made the music to a Levi's commercial in 1983, a track called "Rivets".

The album's initial release on CD featured a different track listing from the initial LP release as the songs were interspersed with remixes. When the album was next re-released on CD in 1999, it featured the original track listing with seven bonus tracks consisting of various B-sides and remixes from the Lament period added to the end of the album.

The album was once again re-released in 2009 as a double CD set. The first disc consisted of the original album remastered. The second disc contained remixes, B-sides and previously unreleased "work in progress" versions of songs.

Track listing

LP track listing
Side A
"White China" – 3:50
"One Small Day" – 4:30
"Dancing with Tears in My Eyes" – 4:39
"Lament" – 4:40

Side B
"Man of Two Worlds" – 4.27 (featuring Gaelic vocals by Mae McKenna )
"Heart of the Country" – 5:05
"When the Time Comes" – 4:56
"A Friend I Call Desire" – 5:09

CD and cassette track listing
All songs written by Warren Cann, Chris Cross, Billy Currie, and Midge Ure.

Cassette
Side One
"White China" – 3:50
"One Small Day" – 4:30
"Dancing with Tears in My Eyes" – 4:39
"Lament" – 4:40
"One Small Day [Extended Mix]" (aka [Special Remix Extra] from limited edition UK 12 inch single) - 8:31
Side Two
"Man of Two Worlds" – 4:27 (featuring Gaelic vocals by Mae McKenna)
"Heart of the Country" – 5:05
"When the Time Comes" – 4:56
"A Friend I Call Desire" – 5:09
"Lament [Extended Mix]" - 8:01

CD
"White China" – 3:50
"One Small Day" – 4:30
"Dancing with Tears in My Eyes" – 4:39
"Lament" – 4:40
"White China [Special Mix]"
"One Small Day [Extended Mix]" (aka [Special Remix Extra] from limited edition UK 12 inch single) - 8:31 
"Man of Two Worlds" – 4:27 (featuring Gaelic vocals by Mae McKenna)
"Heart of the Country" – 5:05
"When the Time Comes" – 4:56
"A Friend I Call Desire" – 5:09
"Lament [Extended Mix]" - 8:01

1999 UK re-release
"White China" – 3:52
"One Small Day" – 4:33
"Dancing with Tears in My Eyes" – 4:40
"Lament" – 4:42
"Man of Two Worlds" – 4:28
"Heart of the Country" – 5:07
"When the Time Comes" – 4:58
"A Friend I Call Desire" – 5:13
"Easterly" – 3:49
"Building" – 3:14
"Heart of the Country (Instrumental)" – 4:25
"Man of Two Worlds (Instrumental)" – 4:33
"White China (Special Mix)" – 8:25
"One Small Day (Extended Mix)" – 8:31
"Lament (Extended Mix)" – 8:01

2009 Remastered Definitive Edition
Disc one
White China – 3:53
One Small Day – 4:33
Dancing with Tears in My Eyes – 4:40
Lament – 4:41
Man of Two Worlds – 4:28
Heart of the Country – 5:06
When the Time Comes – 4:57
A Friend I Call Desire – 5:11

Disc two
One Small Day (Special 12″ Remix) – 7:51
Easterly (B-side of One Small Day) – 3:48
Lament (Extended 12″ version) – 8:02
One Small Day (Limited Edition Remix) – 8:31
Dancing with Tears in My Eyes (Special 12″ Remix) – 10:02
Building (B-side of Dancing with Tears in My Eyes) – 3:11
White China (Special Mix, original CD version) – 8:23
Heart of the Country (Instrumental) (B-side of Lament) – 4:24
One Small Day (Final Mix) – 7:45
A Friend I Call Desire (Work in Progress Mix) – 5:39
Lament (Work in Progress Mix) – 4:53

Personnel
Ultravox
 Warren Cann – drums, electronic percussion, backing vocals
 Chris Cross – bass, synthesizer, backing vocals
 Billy Currie – keyboards, violin
 Midge Ure – guitar, lead vocals

Additional musicians
 Gaelic vocals on "Man of Two Worlds" by Mae McKenna
 String quartet on "Heart of the Country" by Amanda Woods, Jacky Woods, Margaret Roseberry, Robert Woollard
 Backing vocals on "A Friend I Call Desire" by Shirley Roden and Debi Doss

Charts

Weekly charts

Year-end charts

Certifications

References

1984 albums
Chrysalis Records albums
Scottish Gaelic music
Ultravox albums
Albums produced by Midge Ure